Those Kids from Town is a 1942 British, black-and-white, comedy-drama propaganda film war film, directed by Lance Comfort and starring George Cole, Harry Fowler, Percy Marmont, Ronald Shiner as Mr. Bert Burns and Charles Victor as Harry, the Vicar. It was produced by Richard Vernon and presented by British National Films and Anglo-American Film Corporation. The film is adapted for the screen, by Adrian Alington, from his own, topical novel These Our Strangers, dealing with the experiences of a group of wartime evacuee children from London, sent to safety in a rural village, and their interaction with the host community.  Of the juvenile actors involved, Fowler (making his screen debut here aged 15) and Cole (then 16) would go on to very successful adult careers, while Angela Glynne and Stanley Escane had more modest careers for the next decade or so.

Synopsis
On the outbreak of the Second World War, a group of six children from the East End of London are evacuated to the village of Payling Green.  The boisterous pair Charlie and Ern are lodged with the local vicar and proceed to torment, mock and terrorise his sensitive and delicate son.  They then get involved in petty-thieving and vandalism, before being taken under the protective wing of a local female novelist with progressive social views.

Sisters Liz and Maud are placed with a pair of old-fashioned and stern spinster sisters and chafe under the constrictions of the discipline imposed on them.  They become increasingly unhappy until they are taken in by the local Earl, who discovers Liz's singing talent and proposes to sponsor her to train professionally. Liz's parents are called to visit and her father at first bridles at the interference of a member of the gentry in his daughter's life, before being brought round to the view that her talent should be nurtured.

Cast

 George Cole as Charlie
 Harry Fowler as Ern
 Percy Marmont as Earl
 Shirley Lenner as Liz
 Angela Glynne as Maud
 Jeanne de Casalis as Sheila
 Charles Victor as Harry, the Vicar
 Olive Sloane as Vicar's Wife
 Stanley Escane as Stan

 Leslie Adams as Arthur
 Dane Gordon as Vicar's Son
 Maire O'Neill as Housekeeper
 Ronald Shiner as Mr. Bert Burns
 Josephine Wilson as Mrs. Burns
 Hay Petrie as Ted Roberts
 D. J. Williams as Butler
 Sydney King as Donald
 Bransby Williams as Uncle Sid

Reception
No print of Those Kids from Town is known to survive and it is currently classified as "missing, believed lost".  Contemporary reviews commended the film for exploring a timely subject which had not previously been tackled on screen, and gave it a generally sympathetic reception.  However comments suggest that rather than aiming for a documentary-realism feel, Comfort fell back on an uneasy mixture of obvious pathos and broad comedy. Kine Weekly said it had "some good moments and a certain amount of child psychology, but it hardly presents a good case for evacuation".  The Daily Film Renter labelled it "commendable popular entertainment", while Cinema praised "sympathetic direction...(which) cleverly sets wartime atmosphere and..a convincing picture of reactions of parents, children and hosts", but felt the film faltered badly in its later stages by "resorting to frank slapstick".   Another trade reviewer complimented the film as a whole, but felt that it "made no attempt to solve the problems with any profound searchings" and its overall tone was "more burlesque than life".

References

External links
 
 
 

1942 films
1940s war comedy-drama films
British black-and-white films
British war comedy-drama films
Films directed by Lance Comfort
British World War II propaganda films
Films set on the home front during World War II
Films based on British novels
British World War II films
Films shot at British National Studios
1940s English-language films